Orexana is a genus of small, air-breathing land snails, terrestrial pulmonate gastropod mollusks in the family Geomitridae. 

It is distributed along west coast of Morocco and Canary Islands.

Species 
Species within the genus Orexana include:
 Orexana ultima (Mousson, 1872)

References 

Geomitridae